Michael Brough may refer to:

 Michael Brough (game designer) (born 1985), New Zealand video game developer
 Michael Brough (footballer) (born 1981), English footballer